The Johannine Comma is an interpolated phrase (comma) in verses  of the First Epistle of John.

The text (with the comma in italics and enclosed by square brackets) in the King James Bible reads:

It became a touchpoint for the Christian theological debate over the doctrine of the Trinity from the early church councils to the Catholic and Protestant disputes in the early modern period.

The passage appears to have originated as a gloss in a Latin manuscript around the end of the 4th century, and was subsequently incorporated into the text of the Old Latin Bible during the 5th century, though not the earliest Vulgate manuscripts. It began to appear in manuscripts of the Vulgate starting after , and subsequently entered the Greek manuscript tradition in the 15th century (see Inclusion by Erasmus).

The comma is absent from the Ethiopic, Aramaic, Syriac, Slavic, Armenian, Georgian, and Arabic translations of the Greek New Testament. It appears in some English translations of the Bible via its inclusion in the first printed New Testament, Novum Instrumentum omne by Erasmus, where it first appeared in the 1522 third edition. In spite of its late date, some members of the King James Only movement have argued for its authenticity.

Text
The "Johannine Comma" is a short clause found in 1 John 5:7–8.

Erasmus omitted the text of the Johannine Comma from his first and second editions of the Greek-Latin New Testament (the ) because it was not in his Greek manuscripts. He added the text to his  in 1522 after being accused of reviving Arianism and after he was informed of a Greek manuscript that contained the verse. 

Many subsequent early printed editions of the Bible include it, such as the Coverdale Bible (1535), the Geneva Bible (1560), the Douay-Rheims Bible (1610), and the King James Bible (1611). In the 1500s it was not always included in Latin New Testament editions, though it was in the Sixto-Clementine Vulgate (1592).

The text (with the Comma in square brackets and italicised) in the King James Bible reads:

The text (with the Comma in square brackets and italicised) in the Latin of the Sixto-Clementine Vulgate reads:

The text (with the Comma in square brackets and italicised) in the Greek of the  reads:

There are several variant versions of the Latin and Greek texts.

English translations based on a modern critical text have omitted the comma from the main text since the English Revised Version (1881), including the New American Standard Bible (NASB), English Standard Version (ESV), and New Revised Standard Version (NRSV).

The Catholic tradition publishes Vulgate editions which have the verse, such as the Rheims, the Confraternity Bible (1941), the Knox Bible (1945), the Jerusalem Bible (1966) and the New Jerusalem Bible (1985). However the Holy See's  (1979) omits the comma as it is based on the modern critical text. The Revised Standard Version Catholic Edition (1965 and 2006) and New American Bible (1970 and 1986) also omit the comma.

Origin

Several early sources which one might expect to include the Comma Johanneum in fact omit it. For example, Clement of Alexandria's quotation of 1 John 5:8 does not include the Comma.

The earliest reference to what might be the Comma appears by the 3rd-century Church father Cyprian (died 258), who in Unity of the Church 1.6 quoted John 10:30: "Again it is written of the Father, and of the Son, and of the Holy Spirit, 'And these three are one.

The first work to quote the Comma Johanneum as an actual part of the Epistle's text appears to be the 4th century Latin homily , probably written by Priscillian of Ávila (died 385), or his close follower Bishop Instantius.

This part of the homily was in many Old Latin and Vulgate manuscripts. It was subsequently back-translated into the Greek, but it occurs in the text of only four of the Greek manuscripts of First John and in the margin of five more. The earliest known Greek ms. occurrence appears to be a later addition to a 10th-century manuscript now in the Bodleian Library. The exact date of the addition is not known; in this manuscript, the Comma is a variant reading offered as an alternative to the main text. The other seven sources date to the fourteenth century (Codex Ottobonianus) or later, and four of the seven are hand-written in the manuscript margins. In one manuscript, back-translated into Greek from the Vulgate, the phrase "and these three are one" is not present.

No Syriac manuscripts include the Comma, and its presence in some printed Syriac Bibles is due to back-translation from the Latin Vulgate. Coptic manuscripts and those from Ethiopian churches also do not include it.

Manuscripts

The comma is not in two of the oldest extant Vulgate manuscripts, Codex Fuldensis and the Codex Amiatinus, although it is referenced in the Prologue to the Canonical Epistles of Fuldensis and appears in Old Latin manuscripts of similar antiquity.

The earliest extant Latin manuscripts supporting the comma are dated from the 5th to 7th century. The Freisinger fragment, León palimpsest, besides the younger Codex Speculum, New Testament quotations extant in an 8th- or 9th-century manuscript.

The comma does not appear in the older Greek manuscripts. Nestle-Aland is aware of eight Greek manuscripts that contain the comma. The date of the addition is late, probably dating to the time of Erasmus. In one manuscript, back-translated into Greek from the Vulgate, the phrase "and these three are one" is not present.

Both  (NA27) and the United Bible Societies (UBS4) provide three variants. The numbers here follow UBS4, which rates its preference for the first variant as { A }, meaning "virtually certain" to reflect the original text. The second variant is a longer Greek version found in the original text of five manuscripts and the margins of five others. All of the other 500 plus Greek manuscripts that contain 1 John support the first variant. The third variant is found only in Latin manuscripts and patristic works. The Latin variant is considered a trinitarian gloss, explaining or paralleled by the second Greek variant.

The comma in Greek. All non-lectionary evidence cited: Minuscules 61 (Codex Montfortianus), 629 (Codex Ottobonianus, 14th/15th century), 918 (Codex Escurialensis, Σ. I. 5, 16th century), 2318 (18th century) and 2473 (17th century).
 The comma at the margins of Greek at the margins of minuscules 88 (Codex Regis, 11th century with margins added at the 16th century), 177 (BSB Cod. graec. 211), 221 (10th century with margins added at the 15th/16th century), 429 (Codex Guelferbytanus, 14th century with margins added at the 16th century), 636 (16th century).
The comma in Latin.  [or ]  [or: ]  [... "giving evidence on earth, spirit, water and blood, and these three are one in Christ Jesus. 8 And the three, which give evidence in heaven, are father word and spirit."] All evidence from Fathers cited: Clementine edition of Vulgate translation; Pseudo-Augustine's  (V), also (these three with some variation) Cyprian, Ps-Cyprian, & Priscillian (died 385) . And Contra-Varimadum, and Ps-Vigilius, Fulgentius of Ruspe (died 527) , Cassiodorus .

The appearance of the Comma in the manuscript evidence is represented in the following tables:

Patristic writers

Clement of Alexandria 
The comma is absent from an extant fragment of Clement of Alexandria, through Cassiodorus (6th century), with homily style verse references from 1 John, including verse 1 John 5:6 and 1 John 5:8 without verse 7, the heavenly witnesses.

Another reference that is studied is from Clement's Prophetic Extracts:

This is seen by some as allusion evidence that Clement was familiar with the verse.

Tertullian 
Tertullian, in Against Praxeas, supports a Trinitarian view by quoting John 10:30:

While many other commentators have argued against any Comma evidence here, most emphatically John Kaye's, "far from containing an allusion to 1 Jo. v. 7, it furnishes most decisive proof that he knew nothing of the verse". Georg Strecker comments cautiously "An initial echo of the  occurs as early as Tertullian Adv. Pax. 25.1 (CChr 2.1195; written c. 215). In his commentary on John 16:14 he writes that the Father, Son, and Paraclete are one, but not one person. However, this passage cannot be regarded as a certain attestation of the "

References from Tertullian in De Pudicitia 21:16 (On Modesty):

and De Baptismo:

have also been presented as verse allusions.

Treatise on Rebaptism 
The Treatise on Rebaptism, placed as a 3rd-century writing and transmitted with Cyprian's works, has two sections that directly refer to the earthly witnesses, and thus has been used against authenticity by Nathaniel Lardner, Alfred Plummer and others.  However, because of the context being water baptism and the precise wording being , the Matthew Henry Commentary uses this as evidence for Cyprian speaking of the heavenly witnesses in Unity of the Church. Arthur Cleveland Coxe and Nathaniel Cornwall also consider the evidence as suggestively positive, as do Westcott and Hort. After approaching the Tertullian and Cyprian references negatively, "morally certain that they would have quoted these words had they known them" Westcott writes about the Rebaptism Treatise:

Jerome 
The Catholic Encyclopedia of 1910 asserts that Jerome "does not seem to know the text", but Charles Forster suggests that the "silent publication of [the text] in the Vulgate ... gives the clearest proof that down to his time the genuineness of this text had never been disputed or questioned." (See also: Pseudo-Jerome below)

Marcus Celedensis 
Coming down with the writings of Jerome is the extant statement of faith attributed to Marcus Celedensis, friend and correspondent to Jerome, presented to Cyril:

Phoebadius of Agen 
Similarly, Jerome wrote of Phoebadius of Agen in his Lives of Illustrious Men. "Phoebadius, bishop of Agen, in Gaul, published a book Against the Arians. There are said to be other works by him, which I have not yet read. He is still living, infirm with age." William Hales looks at Phoebadius:

Griesbach argued that Phoebadius was only making an allusion to Tertullian, and his unusual explanation was commented on by Reithmayer.

Augustine 
Augustine of Hippo has been said to be completely silent on the matter, which has been taken as evidence that the Comma did not exist as part of the epistle's text in his time. This  has been contested by other scholars, including Fickermann and Metzger.  In addition, some Augustine references have been seen as verse allusions.

The City of God section, from Book V, Chapter 11:

has often been referenced as based upon the scripture verse of the heavenly witnesses. George Strecker acknowledges the City of God reference: "Except for a brief remark in  (5.11; CChr 47.141), where he says of Father, Word, and Spirit that the three are one. But it is certain on the basis of the work  2.22.3 (PL 42.794–95) that he interpreted 1 John 5:7–8 in trinitarian terms." Similarly, Homily 10 on the first Epistle of John has been asserted as an allusion to the verse:

 has received attention especially for these two sections, especially the allegorical interpretation.

John Scott Porter writes:

Thomas Joseph Lamy offers a different view based on the context and Augustine's purpose. Similarly Thomas Burgess. And Norbert Fickermann's reference and scholarship supports the idea that Augustine may have deliberately bypassed a direct quote of the heavenly witnesses.

Leo the Great 
In the Tome of Leo, written to Archbishop Flavian of Constantinople, read at the Council of Chalcedon on 10 October 451 AD, and published in Greek, Leo the Great's usage of 1 John 5 has him moving in discourse from verse 6 to verse 8:

This epistle from Leo was considered by Richard Porson to be the "strongest proof" of verse inauthenticity. In response, Thomas Burgess points out that the context of Leo's argument would not call for the 7th verse. And that the verse was referenced in a fully formed manner centuries earlier than Porson's claim, at the time of Fulgentius and the Council of Carthage. Burgess pointed out that there were multiple confirmations that the verse was in the Latin Bibles of Leo's day. Burgess argued, ironically, that the fact that Leo could move from verse 6 to 8 for argument context is, in the bigger picture, favourable to authenticity. "Leo's omission of the Verse is not only counterbalanced by its actual existence in contemporary copies, but the passage of his Letter is, in some material respects, favourable to the authenticity of the Verse, by its contradiction to some assertions confidently urged against the Verse by its opponents, and essential to their theory against it." Today, with the discovery of additional Old Latin evidences in the 19th century, the discourse of Leo is rarely referenced as a significant evidence against verse authenticity.

Cyprian of Carthage - Unity of the Church 

The 3rd-century Church father Cyprian, in writing on the Unity of the Church 1.6, quoted John 10:30 and another scriptural spot:

The Catholic Encyclopedia concludes "Cyprian ... seems undoubtedly to have had it in mind". Against this view, Daniel B. Wallace writes that since Cyprian does not quote 'the Father, the Word, and the Holy Spirit', "this in the least does not afford proof that he knew of such wording". The fact that Cyprian did not quote the "exact wording… indicates that a Trinitarian interpretation was superimposed on the text by Cyprian". The Critical Text apparatuses have taken varying positions on the Cyprian reference.

The Cyprian citation, dating to more than a century before any extant Epistle of John manuscripts and before the Arian controversies that are often considered pivotal in verse addition/omission debate, remains a central focus of comma research and textual apologetics. The Scrivener view is often discussed. Westcott and Hort assert: "Tert and Cyp use language which renders it morally certain that they would have quoted these words had they known them; Cyp going so far as to assume a reference to the Trinity in the conclusion of v. 8"

In the 20th century, Lutheran scholar Francis Pieper wrote in Christian Dogmatics emphasizing the antiquity and significance of the reference. Frequently commentators have seen Cyprian as having the verse in his Latin Bible, even if not directly supporting and commenting on verse authenticity. Some writers have also seen the denial of the verse in the Bible of Cyprian as worthy of special note and humor.

Daniel B. Wallace notes that although Cyprian uses 1 John to argue for the Trinity, he appeals to this as an allusion via the three witnesses—"written of"—rather than by quoting a proof-text—"written that". Therefore, despite the view of some that Cyprian referred to the passage, the fact that other theologians such as Athanasius of Alexandria and Sabellius and Origen never quoted or referred to that passage is one reason why even many Trinitarians later on also considered the text spurious, and not to have been part of the original text.

(Epistle 73) 
The second, lesser reference from Cyprian that has been involved in the verse debate is from  23.12. Cyprian, while discussing baptism, writes:

Knittel emphasizes that Cyprian would be familiar with the Bible in Greek as well as Latin. "Cyprian understood Greek. He read Homer, Plato, Hermes Trismegistus and Hippocrates ... he translated into Latin the Greek epistle written to him by Firmilianus".
UBS-4 has its entry for text inclusion as (Cyprian).

Ps-Cyprian - Hundredfold Reward for Martyrs and Ascetics 
The Hundredfold Reward for Martyrs and Ascetics:  speaks of the Father, Son and Holy Spirit as "three witnesses" and was passed down with the Cyprian corpus. This was only first published in 1914 and thus does not show up in the historical debate. UBS-4 includes this in the apparatus as (Ps-Cyprian).

Origen and Athanasius 

Those who see Cyprian as negative evidence assert that other church writers, such as Athanasius of Alexandria and Origen, never quoted or referred to the passage, which they would have done if the verse was in the Bibles of that era. The contrasting position is that there are in fact such references, and that "evidences from silence" arguments, looking at the extant early church writer material, should not be given much weight as reflecting absence in the manuscripts—with the exception of verse-by-verse homilies, which were uncommon in the Ante-Nicene era.

Origen's scholium on Psalm 123:2 
In the scholium on Psalm 123 attributed to Origen is the commentary:

This has been considered by many commentators, including the translation source Nathaniel Ellsworth Cornwall, as an allusion to verse 7. Ellsworth especially noted the Richard Porson comment in response to the evidence of the Psalm commentary: "The critical chemistry which could extract the doctrine of the Trinity from this place must have been exquisitely refining". Fabricius wrote about the Origen wording "ad locum 1 Joh v. 7 alludi ab origene non est dubitandum".

Athanasius and Arius at the Council of Nicea 
Traditionally, Athanasius was considered to lend support to the authenticity of the verse, one reason being the Disputation with Arius at the Council of Nicea which circulated with the works of Athanasius, where is found:

Today, many scholars consider this a later work Pseudo-Athanasius, perhaps by Maximus the Confessor. Charles Forster in New Plea argues for the writing as stylistically Athanasius. While the author and date are debated, this is a Greek reference directly related to the doctrinal Trinitarian-Arian controversies, and one that purports to be an account of Nicaea when those doctrinal battles were raging. The reference was given in UBS-3 as supporting verse inclusion, yet was removed from UBS-4 for reasons unknown.

The Synopsis of Scripture, often ascribed to Athanasius, has also been referenced as indicating awareness of the Comma.

Priscillian of Avila 
The earliest quotation which some scholars consider a direct reference to the heavenly witnesses from the First Epistle of John is from the Spaniard Priscillian . The Latin reads:

The English translation:

Theodor Zahn calls this "the earliest quotation of the passage which is certain and which can be definitely dated (circa 380)", a view expressed by Westcott, Brooke, Metzger and others.

Priscillian was probably a Sabellianist or Modalist Monarchian. And Priscillian in the same section references The Unity of the Church section from Cyprian. In the early 1900s the Karl Künstle theory of Priscillian origination and interpolation was popular: "The verse is an interpolation, first quoted and perhaps introduced by Priscillian (a.d. 380) as a pious fraud to convince doubters of the doctrine of the Trinity."

Another complementary early reference is an exposition of faith published in 1883 by Carl Paul Caspari from the Ambrosian manuscript, which also contains the Muratorian (canon) fragment.

Edgar Simmons Buchanan, points out that the reading  is textually valuable, referencing 1 John 5:7.

The authorship is uncertain, however it is often placed around the same period as Priscillian. Karl Künstle saw the writing as anti-Priscillianist, which would have competing doctrinal positions utilizing the verse. Alan England Brooke notes the similarities of the Expositio with the Priscillian form, and the Priscillian form with the Leon Palimpsest.

John Chapman looked closely at these materials and the section in  around the Priscillian faith statement . Chapman saw an indication that Priscillian found himself bound to defend the comma by citing from the "Unity of the Church" Cyprian section.

Council of Carthage, 484 

"The Comma ... was invoked at Carthage in 484 when the Catholic bishops of North Africa confessed their faith before Huneric the Vandal (Victor de Vita, Historia persecutionis Africanae Prov 2.82 [3.11]; CSEL, 7, 60)." The Confession of Faith representing the hundreds of Orthodox bishops included the following section, emphasizing the heavenly witnesses to teach  ("clearer than the light"):

and  

There are additional heavenly witnesses references that are considered to be from the same period as the Council of Carthage, including references that have been attributed to Vigilius Tapsensis who attended the Council. Raymond Brown gives one summary:
... in the century following Priscillian, the chief appearance of the Comma is in tractates defending the Trinity. In PL 62 227–334 there is a work  consisting of twelve books ... In Books 1 and 10 (PL 62, 243D, 246B, 297B) the Comma is cited three times. Another work on the Trinity consisting of three books  ... North African origin ca. 450 seems probable. The Comma is cited in 1.5 (CC 90, 20–21).

The  reference:

This is in the UBS apparatus as Varimadum.

Ebrard, in referencing this quote, comments, "We see that he had before him the passage in his New Testament in its corrupt form; but also, that the gloss was already in the text, but that it was so widely diffused and acknowledged in the West as to be appealed to by him bona fide in his contest with his Arian opponents."

Fulgentius of Ruspe 

In the 6th century, Fulgentius of Ruspe, like Cyprian a father of the North African Church, skilled in Greek as well as his native Latin, used the verse in the doctrinal battles of the day, giving an Orthodox explanation of the verse against Arianism and Sabellianism.

From  ("Reply against the Arians"; Migne (Ad 10; CC 91A, 797)):

Then Fulgentius discusses the earlier reference by Cyprian, and the interweaving of the two Johannine verses, John 10:30 and 1 John 5:7.

Also from Fulgentius in :

Today these references are generally accepted as probative to the verse being in the Bible of Fulgentius.

A reference in  that is a :

has been assigned away from Fulgentius to a "Catholic controvertist of the same age".

Pseudo-Jerome, Prologue to the Catholic Epistles 

Many Vulgate manuscripts, including the Codex Fuldensis, the earliest extant Vulgate manuscript, include a Prologue to the Canonical Epistles referring to the Comma.

The Latin text is online. The Prologue presents itself as a letter of Jerome to Eustochium, to whom Jerome dedicated his commentary on the prophets Isaiah and Ezekiel. Despite the first-person salutation, some claim it is the work of an unknown imitator from the late 5th century. (The  Prologue references the Comma, but the Codex's version of 1 John omits it, which has led many to believe that the Prologue reference is spurious.) Its inauthenticity is arguably stressed by the omission of the passage from the manuscript's own text of 1 John; however, this can also be seen as confirming the claim in the Prologue that scribes tended to drop the text.

Cassiodorus 

Cassiodorus wrote Bible commentaries, and was familiar with Old Latin and Vulgate manuscripts, seeking out sacred manuscripts. Cassiodorus was also skilled in Greek. In , first published in 1721 by Scipio Maffei, in the commentary section on 1 John, from the Cassiodorus corpus, is written:

Thomas Joseph Lamy describes the Cassiodorus section and references that Tischendorf saw this as Cassiodorus having the text in his Bible. However, earlier "Porson endeavoured to show that Cassiodorus had, in his copy, no more than the 8th verse, to which he added the gloss of Eucherius, with whose writings he was acquainted."

Isidore of Seville 

Arthur-Marie Le Hir asserts that evidences like Isidore and the Ambrose Ansbert Commentary on Revelation show early circulation of the Vulgate with the verse and thus also should be considered in the issues of Jerome's original Vulgate text and the authenticity of the Vulgate Prologue. Cassiodorus has also been indicated as reflecting the Vulgate text, rather than simply the Vetus Latina.

Commentary on Revelation 
Ambrose Ansbert refers to the scripture verse in his Revelation commentary:

"Ambrose Ansbert, in the middle of the eighth century, wrote a comment upon the Apocalypse, in which this verse is applied, in explaining the 5th verse of the first chapter of the Revelation".

Medieval use

Fourth Lateran Council

In the Middle Ages a Trinitarian doctrinal debate arose around the position of Joachim of Florence (1135–1202) which was different from the more traditional view of Peter Lombard (c. 1100–1160).  When the Fourth Council of the Lateran was held in 1215 at Rome, with hundreds of Bishops attending, the understanding of the heavenly witnesses was a primary point in siding with Lombard, against the writing of Joachim.

The Council thus printed the verse in both Latin and Greek, and this may have contributed to later scholarship references in Greek to the verse. The reference to "some manuscripts" showed an acknowledgment of textual issues, yet this likely related to "and the three are one" in verse eight, not the heavenly witnesses in verse seven. The manuscript issue for the final phrase in verse eight and the commentary by Thomas Aquinas were an influence upon the text and note of the Complutensian Polyglot.

Latin commentaries

In this period, the greater portion of Bible commentary was written in Latin.  The references in this era are extensive and wide-ranging.  Some of the better-known writers who utilized the comma as scripture, in addition to Peter Lombard and Joachim of Fiore, include Gerbert of Aurillac (Pope Sylvester), Peter Abelard, Bernard of Clairvaux, Duns Scotus, Roger of Wendover (historian, including the Lateran Council), Thomas Aquinas (many verse uses, including one which has Origen relating to "the three that give witness in heaven"), William of Ockham (of razor fame), Nicholas of Lyra and the commentary of the Glossa Ordinaria.

Greek commentaries

Emanual Calecas in the 14th and Joseph Bryennius (c. 1350–1430) in the 15th century reference the comma in their Greek writings.

The Orthodox accepted the comma as Johannine scripture notwithstanding its absence in the Greek manuscripts line. The Orthodox Confession of Faith, published in Greek in 1643 by the multilingual scholar Peter Mogila specifically references the comma. "Accordingly the Evangelist teacheth (1 John v. 7.) There are three that bear Record in Heaven, the Father, the Word, and the Holy Ghost and these three are one …"

Armenia – Synod of Sis

The Epistle of Gregory, the Bishop of Sis, to Haitho c. 1270 utilized 1 John 5:7 in the context of the use of water in the mass. The Synod of Sis of 1307 expressly cited the verse, and deepened the relationship with Rome.

Commentators generally see the Armenian text from the 13th century on as having been modified by the interaction with the Latin church and Bible, including the addition of the comma in some manuscripts.

Manuscripts and special notations

There are a number of special manuscript notations and entries relating to 1 John 5:7. Vulgate scholar Samuel Berger reports on Corbie MS 13174 in the Bibliothèque nationale in Paris that shows the scribe listing four distinct textual variations of the heavenly witnesses. Three are understood by the scribe to have textual lineages of Athanasius, Augustine (two) and Fulgentius. And there is in addition a margin text of the heavenly witnesses that matches the Theodulphian recension. The Franciscan Correctorium gives a note about there being manuscripts with the verses transposed. The Regensburg ms. referenced by Fickermann discusses the positions of Jerome and Augustine. Contarini, The Glossa Ordinaria discusses the Vulgate Prologue in the Preface, in addition to its commentary section on the verse. John J. Contrini in Haimo of Auxerre, Abbot of Sasceium (Cessy-les-Bois), and a New Sermon on I John v. 4–10 discusses a 9th-century manuscript and the Leiden sermon.

Inclusion by Erasmus

The central figure in the 16th-century history of the Johannine Comma is the humanist Erasmus, and his efforts leading to the publication of the Greek New Testament. The comma was omitted in the first edition in 1516, the Nouum instrumentum omne: diligenter ab Erasmo Roterodamo recognitum et emendatum and the second edition of 1519. The verse is placed in the third edition, published in 1522, and those of 1527 and 1535.

Erasmus included the comma, with commentary, in his paraphrase edition, first published in 1520. And in Ratio seu methodus compendio perueniendi ad ueram theologiam, first published in 1518, Erasmus included the comma in the interpretation of John 12 and 13. Erasmian scholar John Jack Bateman, discussing the Paraphrase and the Ratio uerae theologiae, says of these uses of the comma that "Erasmus attributes some authority to it despite any doubts he had about its transmission in the Greek text."

The absence of the comma from the first two editions received a sharp response from churchmen and scholars, and was discussed and defended by Erasmus in the correspondence with Edward Lee and Diego López de Zúñiga (Stunica), and Erasmus is also known to have referenced the verse in correspondence with Antoine Brugnard in 1518. The first two Erasmus editions only had a small note about the verse. The major Erasmus writing regarding comma issues was in the Annotationes to the third edition of 1522, expanded in the fourth edition of 1527 and then given a small addition in the fifth edition of 1535.

Erasmus is said to have replied to his critics that the comma did not occur in any of the Greek manuscripts he could find, but that he would add it to future editions if it appeared in a single Greek manuscript. Such a manuscript was subsequently produced, some say concocted, by a Franciscan, and Erasmus, true to his word, added the comma to his 1522 edition, but with a lengthy footnote setting out his suspicion that the manuscript had been prepared expressly to confute him. This change was accepted into editions based on the Textus Receptus, the chief source for the King James Version, thereby fixing the comma firmly in the English-language scriptures for centuries. There is no explicit evidence, however, that such a promise was ever made.

The authenticity of the story of Erasmus is questioned by many scholars. Bruce Metzger removed this story from his book's (The Text of the New Testament) third edition although it was included in the first and second editions in the same book.

Modern reception

In 1807 Charles Butler described the dispute to that point as consisting of three distinct phases.

Erasmus and the Reformation
The 1st phase began with the disputes and correspondence involving Erasmus with Edward Lee followed by Jacobus Stunica. And about the 16th-century controversies, Thomas Burgess summarized "In the sixteenth century its chief opponents were Socinus, Blandrata, and the Fratres Poloni; its defenders, Ley, Beza, Bellarmine, and Sixtus Senensis." In the 17th century John Selden in Latin and Francis Cheynell and Henry Hammond were English writers with studies on the verse, Johann Gerhard and Abraham Calovius from the German Lutherans, writing in Latin.

Simon, Newton, Mill and Bengel
The 2nd dispute stage begins with Sandius, the Arian around 1670. Francis Turretin published De Tribus Testibus Coelestibus in 1674 and the verse was a central focus of the writings of Symon Patrick. In 1689 the attack on authenticity by Richard Simon was published in English, in his Critical History of the Text of the New Testament. Many responded directly to the views of Simon, including Thomas Smith, Friedrich Kettner, James Benigne Bossuet, Johann Majus, Thomas Ittigius, Abraham Taylor and the published sermons of Edmund Calamy.  There was the verse defences by John Mill and later by Johann Bengel. Also in this era was the David Martin and Thomas Emlyn debate. There were attacks on authenticity by Richard Bentley and Samuel Clarke and William Whiston and defence of authenticity by John Guyse in the Practical Expositor. There were writings by numerous additional scholars, including posthumous publication in London of Isaac Newton's Two Letters in 1754 (An Historical Account of Two Notable Corruptions of Scripture), which he had written to John Locke in 1690. The mariner's compass poem of Bengel was given in a slightly modified form by John Wesley.

Travis and Porson debate

The third stage of the controversy begins with the quote from Edward Gibbon in 1776:
Even the Scriptures themselves were profaned by their rash and sacrilegious hands. The memorable text, which asserts the unity of the three who bear witness in heaven, is condemned by the universal silence of the orthodox fathers, ancient versions, and authentic manuscripts.  It was first alleged by the Catholic bishops whom Hunneric summoned to the conference of Carthage. An allegorical interpretation, in the form, perhaps, of a marginal note, invaded the text of the Latin Bibles, which were renewed and corrected in a dark period of ten centuries.
It is followed by the response of George Travis that led to the Porson–Travis debate. In the 1794 3rd edition of Letters to Edward Gibbon, Travis included a 42-part appendix with source references. Another event coincided with the inauguration of this stage of the debate: "a great stirring in sacred science was certainly going on. Griesbach's first edition of the New Testament (1775–7) marks the commencement of a new era." The Griesbach GNT provided an alternative to the Received Text editions to assist as scholarship textual legitimacy for opponents of the verse.

19th century

Some highlights from this era are the Nicholas Wiseman Old Latin and Speculum scholarship, the defence of the verse by the Germans Immanuel Sander, Besser, Georg Karl Mayer and Wilhelm Kölling, the Charles Forster New Plea book which revisited Richard Porson's arguments, and the earlier work by his friend Arthur-Marie Le Hir, Discoveries included the Priscillian reference and Exposito Fidei.  Also Old Latin manuscripts including La Cava, and the moving up of the date of the Vulgate Prologue due to its being found in Codex Fuldensis. Ezra Abbot wrote on 1 John V.7 and Luther's German Bible and Scrivener's analysis came forth in Six Lectures and Plain Introduction. In the 1881 Revision came the full removal of the verse. Daniel McCarthy noted the change in position among the textual scholars, and in French there was the sharp Roman Catholic debate in the 1880s involving Pierre Rambouillet, Auguste-François Maunoury, Jean Michel Alfred Vacant, Elie Philippe and Paulin Martin. In Ireland Charles Vincent Dolman wrote about the Revision and the comma in the Dublin Review, noting that "the heavenly witnesses have departed".

20th century
The 20th century saw the scholarship of Alan England Brooke and Joseph Pohle, the RCC controversy following the 1897 Papal declaration as to whether the verse could be challenged by Catholic scholars, the Karl Künstle Priscillian-origin theory, the detailed scholarship of Augustus Bludau in many papers, the Eduard Riggenbach book, and the Franz Pieper and Edward F. Hills defences. There were specialty papers by Anton Baumstark (Syriac reference), Norbert Fickermann (Augustine), Claude Jenkins (Bede), Mateo del Alamo, Teófilo Ayuso Marazuela, Franz Posset (Luther) and Rykle Borger (Peshitta). Verse dismissals, such as that given by Bruce Metzger, became popular. There was the fine technical scholarship of Raymond Brown. And the continuing publication and studies of the Erasmus correspondence, writings and Annotations, some with English translation. From Germany came Walter Thiele's Old Latin studies and sympathy for the comma being in the Bible of Cyprian, and the research by Henk de Jonge on Erasmus and the Received Text and the comma.

Recent scholarship
The first 20 years of the 21st century have seen a popular revival of interest in the historic verse controversies and the textual debate.  Factors include the growth of interest in the Received Text and the Authorized Version (including the King James Version Only movement) and the questioning of Critical Text theories, the 1995 book by Michael Maynard documenting the historical debate on 1 John 5:7, and the internet ability to spur research and discussion with participatory interaction. In this period, King James Bible defenders and opponents wrote a number of papers on the Johannine Comma, usually published in evangelical literature and on the internet. In textual criticism scholarship circles, the book by Klaus Wachtel Der byzantinische Text der katholischen Briefe: Eine Untersuchung zur Entstehung der Koine des Neuen Testaments, 1995 contains a section with detailed studies on the Comma. Similarly, Der einzig wahre Bibeltext?, published in 2006 by K. Martin Heide.  Special interest has been given to the studies of the Codex Vaticanus umlauts by Philip Barton Payne and Paul Canart, senior paleographer at the Vatican Library. The Erasmus studies have continued, including research on the Valladolid inquiry by Peter G. Bietenholz and Lu Ann Homza. Jan Krans has written on conjectural emendation and other textual topics, looking closely at the Received Text work of Erasmus and Beza. And some elements of the recent scholarship commentary have been especially dismissive and negative.

Catholic Church
The Catholic Church at the Council of Trent in 1546 defined the Biblical canon as "the entire books with all their parts, as these have been wont to be read in the Catholic Church and are contained in the old Latin Vulgate". The Comma appeared in both the Sixtine (1590) and the Clementine (1592) editions of the Vulgate. Although the revised Vulgate contained the Comma, the earliest known copies did not, leaving the status of the Comma Johanneum unclear. On 13 January 1897, during a period of reaction in the Church, the Holy Office decreed that Catholic theologians could not "with safety" deny or call into doubt the Comma's authenticity. Pope Leo XIII approved this decision two days later, though his approval was not in forma specifica—that is, Leo XIII did not invest his full papal authority in the matter, leaving the decree with the ordinary authority possessed by the Holy Office. Three decades later, on 2 June 1927, Pope Pius XI decreed that the Comma Johanneum was open to investigation.

King James Only movement
In more recent years, the Comma has become relevant to the King James Only Movement, a Protestant development most prevalent within the fundamentalist and Independent Baptist branch of the Baptist churches. Many proponents view the Comma as an important Trinitarian text. The defense of the verse by Edward Freer Hills in 1956 in his book The King James Version Defended in the section  "The Johannine Comma (1 John 5:7)" was unusual due to Hills' textual criticism scholarship credentials.

Grammatical analysis 

In 1 John 5:7–8 in the Critical Text and Majority Text, though not the Received Text, we have a shorter text with only the earthly witnesses. And the following words appear.

Grantley Robert McDonald gives the history of the 1780 letter from Eugenius Bulgaris (1716–1806) along with an explanation of the grammatical gender discordance issue when the text has only the earthly witnesses.

Earlier, Desiderius Erasmus noticed the unusual grammar when his text has only the earthly witnesses, and Thomas Naogeorgus (1511-1578) also wondered about the grammar.

In addition, Matthaei reported on a scholium from about 1000 AD Porson's Letters to Travis gives the scholium text as “Three in the masculine gender, in token of the Trinity: the spirit, of the Godhead; the water, of the enlightening knowledge to mankind, by the spirit; the blood, of the incarnation.”

In the 300s, Gregory Nazianzen in Oration 37 disputed with some Macedonian Christians. The context indicates that they pointed out the grammatical issue.

Eugenius Bulgaris saw the "heavenly witnesses" as grammatically necessary to explain the masculine grammar, else the earthly witnesses alone would be a solecism. Frederick Nolan, in his 1815 book, An Inquiry into the Integrity of the Greek Vulgate, brought the argument of Eugenius to the English debate.John Oxlee, in debate with Nolan, took the position that the "earthly witnesses" grammar was sound. Robert Dabney took a position similar to Eugenius Bulgaris and Frederick Nolan, as did Edward Hills.   Daniel Wallace offers a possible explanation for the short text grammar.

In 1 John 5:7-8 in the Received Text, the following words appear (the words in bold print are the words of the Johannine Comma).

(Received Text) 1 John 5:7 … οἱ μαρτυροῦντες ἐν τῷ οὐρανῷ ὁ πατὴρ ὁ λόγος καὶ τὸ ἅγιον πνεῦμα … 8 … οἱ μαρτυροῦντες ἐν τῇ γῇ τὸ πνεῦμα καὶ τὸ ὕδωρ καὶ τὸ αἷμα …

In 1 John 5:7-8 in the Critical Text and Majority Text, the following words appear.

(Critical and Majority Text) 1 John 5:7 … οἱ μαρτυροῦντες 8 τὸ πνεῦμα καὶ τὸ ὕδωρ καὶ τὸ αἷμα …

According to Johann Bengel, Eugenius Bulgaris, John Oxlee and Daniel Wallace, each article-participle phrase (οἱ μαρτυροῦντες) in 1 John 5:7-8 functions as a substantive and agrees with the natural gender (masculine) of the idea being expressed (persons), to which three subsequent appositional (added for clarification) articular (preceded by an article) nouns (ὁ πατὴρ ὁ λόγος καὶ τὸ ἅγιον πνεῦμα / τὸ πνεῦμα καὶ τὸ ὕδωρ καὶ τὸ αἷμα) are added.

According to Frederick Nolan, Robert Dabney and Edward Hills, each article-participle phrase (οἱ μαρτυροῦντες) in 1 John 5:7-8 functions as an adjective that modifies the three subsequent articular nouns (ὁ πατὴρ ὁ λόγος καὶ τὸ ἅγιον πνεῦμα / τὸ πνεῦμα καὶ τὸ ὕδωρ καὶ τὸ αἷμα) and therefore must agree with the grammatical gender (masculine / neuter) of the first subsequent articular noun (ὁ πατὴρ / τὸ πνεῦμα).

Titus 2:13 is an example of how an article-adjective (or article-participle) phrase looks when it functions as an adjective that modifies multiple subsequent nouns.

(Received Text) Titus 2:13 … τὴν μακαρίαν ἐλπίδα καὶ ἐπιφάνειαν  …

Matthew 23:23 is an example of how an article-adjective (or article-participle) phrase looks when it functions as a substantive to which multiple subsequent appositional articular nouns are added.

(Received Text) Matthew 23:23 … τὰ βαρύτερα τοῦ νόμου τὴν κρίσιν καὶ τὸν ἔλεον καὶ τὴν πίστιν …

According to Bengel, Bulgaris, Oxlee and Wallace, 1 John 5:7-8 is like Matthew 23:23, not like Titus 2:13.

According to Nolan, Dabney and Hills, 1 John 5:7-8 is like Titus 2:13, not like Matthew 23:23.

See also

 List of New Testament verses not included in modern English translations
 Textual criticism
 Erasmus 
 Richard Simon (priest) 
 Isaac Newton 
 David Martin (French divine) – the French Bible translator who also defended the authenticity of the Comma Johanneum
 Eugenios Voulgaris - Greek scholar who highlighted the solecism in the short text
 Richard Porson - against authenticity, wrote contra George Travis
 Frederick Nolan (theologian)
 Thomas Burgess (bishop) - wrote books which highlight heavenly witnesses defense
 Edward F. Hills
 Codex Ravianus

Other disputed New Testament passages 
 The Longer Ending of Mark
 Pericope Adulteræ - the woman caught in adultery
 Matthew 16:2b–3 - , ye can discern the face of the sky; but can ye not discern the signs of the times?
 Christ's agony at Gethsemane
 John 5:3b–4 - pool of Bethesda, angel troubled the water
 Doxology to the Lord's Prayer
 Luke 22:19b–20

References

Further reading

 
 
  Republished in 
  Revision of the author's doctoral thesis: 
 
 
 

Biblical criticism
King James Only movement
1st-century Christianity
Johannine literature
Trinitarianism
Bible-related controversies
Christian terminology
New Testament verses